Yanshan University is a university in Qinhuangdao, Hebei, China under the provincial government. It has a student population of 39,000 and a staff population of 3,200 (2,058 are teachers, including 413 full professors and 630 associate professors). It is a national key school and runs state key labs on its campus.

History
The origin of Yanshan University can be traced back to the Harbin Institute of Technology, founded in 1920.

In 1958, the Department of Heavy Machinery of Harbin Institute of Technology and its related specialties moved to the strategic industrial town of Fulaerji, Qiqihar in northeast China's Heilongjiang Province and was renamed the School of Heavy Machinery of the Harbin Institute of Technology. In 1960, the school became independent as the Northeast Heavy Machinery Institute; in 1978, it was accredited as one of the 88 national key institutions of higher learning. Starting in 1985, it began to relocate southward to the historic seaside city of Qinhuangdao in Hebei Province and completed the migration in 1997 when it was accredited by the former State Education Commission to adopt the present name of Yanshan University.

Campus
The Yanshan University campus covers an area of 5,000 mu (or 330 hectares) with a total construction area of nearly one million square meters. At present, the university has a faculty and staff of 3000, including 2,000 teachers, of which 413 are professors (including 200 doctoral advisors) and 630 are associate professors. The university has a student population of 39,000.

Academics
Yanshan University has five postdoctoral research stations, six disciplines of 35 subdisciplines conferring doctoral degrees, 13 disciplines of 80 subdisciplines conferring master's degrees, 16 masters of engineering programs, one Master of Public Administration (MPA) program, one Master of Business Administration (MBA) program, as well as 60 undergraduate programs. With such a wide range of programs, Yanshan University has become a multiversity with emphasis laid on engineering studies and importance attached to liberal arts, sciences, economics, management, law and education.

Yanshan University consists of 21 colleges and schools. It runs five national key disciplines, four key disciplines of national defence, 13 key provincial disciplines, one key national laboratory, 13 key provincial laboratories and engineering centres.

Main schools

School of Electrical Engineering

At present, the School of Electrical Engineering has 233 staff and faculty members, of which 61 are professors (including 36 doctoral advisors, 1 Yangtze River Scholar, 2 China National Funds for Distinguished Young Scholars, 1 National Science Fund for Excellent Young Scholars and 3 Humboldt scholars), and 58 are associate professors. The school has 3859 students (including 85 Ph.D students, 964 postgraduates and 2810 undergraduates).

The school consists of 3 postdoctoral research stations (Control Science and Engineering, Instrument Science and technology and Electrical engineering), 3 first-level disciplines conferring doctoral degrees (16 second-level disciplines conferring doctoral degrees), 4 first-level disciplines conferring master's degrees, 4 masters of engineering programs, 1 strong discipline group of Hebei Province, 3 key disciplines of Hebei Province, 3 Key Laboratories of Hebei Province, 1 National Experimental Teaching Demonstration Center, 1 national characteristic specialty, 1 undergraduate education innovation highlands of Hebei Province, and 1 teaching team of Hebei Province.

School of Information Science and Engineering (School of Software Engineering)
There are 185 staff and faculty in the school, of which 130 are teachers, including 40 professors (23 doctoral supervisors), 58 associate professors, 98 teachers with doctorates. The school has 87 doctoral degree candidates, 736 master's degree candidates, and 2580 undergraduates.

There are two post-doctoral research station in the school, the station of Electronic Science and Technology and the station of Computer Science and Technology, with 4 first level disciplines of doctoral degree awarding entitlement in Electronic Science and Technology, Computer Science and Technology, Optical Engineering and Software Engineering 8 second level disciplines of doctoral degree programs. The school also has 5 first level 
disciplines of master's degree awarding entitlement in Optical Engineering, Electronic Science and Technology, Information and Communication Engineering, Computer Science and Technology and Software Engineering, of which are 11 second level disciplines of master's degree awarding entitlement in Optical Engineering, Physical Electronics, Circuits and Systems, Micro-electronics and Solid State Electronics, Electromagnetic Field and Microwave Technology, Communications and Information Systems, Signal and Information Processing, Computer Architecture, 
Computer Software and Theory, Computer Application Technology and Software Engineering. Information Science and Technology are strong discipline group of Hebei Province, and Optical Engineering, Circuits and Systems, Computer Application Technology are key disciplines of Hebei Province. The school has 2 Key Provincial Laboratories, "the special optical fibre and fibre optic sensing laboratory" and "the Computer virtualisation technology and system integration laboratory". Furthermore, there are four master programs awarding entitlement in Computer Technology, Software Engineering, Electronics and Communication Engineering, Optical Engineering.

During the past 5 years, there are 130 projects including National "973" project, "863" project, the key program and general program of National Natural Science Foundation of China, provincial fund projects and the other related industries’ researching and developing projects. The school receives research funding of more than 37 million RMB, has more than 10 patents, 16 teaching and research awards of provincial and ministerial level. More than 500 papers published in high-level international journals and more than 20 monographs and textbooks.

School of Mechanical Engineering 
At present, there are a total of 3918 students in the School of Mechanical Engineering, including 2394 undergraduate students, 1339 master students and 185 PhD students.

There are more than 300 teachers in the SME, among whom 82 are professors (including 47 PhD supervisors) and 77 are associate professors.

School of Materials Science and Engineering

The school currently enrols 1201 students including 753 undergraduates, 310 master students, and 138 PhD students. Since 2007, over 50% undergraduates in the school were enrolled into graduate programs.

The school employs 103 faculty members and staff, including 50 professors (39 PhD supervisors), 13 
associate professors, and 8 senior engineers.

International relations

Notable alumni
Ding Xuexiang, 1982 — Director of the General Office of the Chinese Communist Party, member of the 19th Party Politburo and member of the Secretariat of the Chinese Communist Party

References

External links
Yanshan University official website

Universities and colleges in Hebei